Tom Dundee (1946–2006) was a singer/songwriter born in Chicago, Illinois, United States.

He began his career in Corrales, New Mexico in 1969. A year later he became a principal member of the Chicago folk scene that spawned such performers as John Prine, Steve Goodman, Mick Scott, and Bonnie Koloc. In the 1980s, Dundee performed throughout the Seattle Music Scene and in the 1990s recorded out of Nashville, Tennessee.

Dundee is best known for his song "A Delicate Balance."  He composed over 300 songs, and recorded with such notables as Timothy B. Schmit, Stephanie Davis, Rita Coolidge and Paul Barrere.  Tom was a close friend and protégé of Steve Goodman, who gave him the guitar on which Steve had composed "The City of New Orleans." According to the Chicago Sun-Times obituary of April 20, 2006, "At the time of his death, Mr. Dundee was a linchpin of the 1970s Chicago folk boom that produced John Prine, Steve Goodman, Bonnie Koloc and Jim Post, who covered 'A Delicate Balance.'"

In concert, Dundee delighted in taking chances with his audience, letting the spontaneity of the moment shape the personality of his show every time out.  He joked with his audience, drew them out of themselves with his music, and wove stories in and out of his songs. As a result, his shows, which typically included some of the oldest chestnuts imaginable as well as Dundee's own compositions, almost always felt fresh.

He died in the Chicago, Illinois neighborhood of Rogers Park on April 18, 2006, of injuries suffered in a motorcycle accident.

Discography
 A Delicate Balance
 Right Lane Man
 Roadmap
 Rough Around the Edge
 Lyfe Tyme Arhyme
 Tom Dundee

Obituary
CHICAGO TRIBUNE: Obituary by Nancy Emrich
Wednesday, April 19, 2006
Tom Dundee, 59 – Chicago's Own Troubadour of the Heart

Deep within there is a feeling
That love and understanding's the door,
And honesty is the key that was given to you and me
To open it and so many more. -- Tom Dundee, "A Delicate Balance"

Tom Dundee would be the first to tell you he wasn't a folk singer.  (Though that will surprise his worldwide folk audiences.)

He was a singer songwriter.

Better yet he was Chicago's truth teller.  Never stridently, rarely loudly.  He whispered the news of our lives that really mattered.  It was musical poetry mixed with candor, astute humor, understating – always - his immense musical skill.

You won't find a website for Tom Dundee.  Maybe another line from his best known song "A Delicate Balance" covers the way Tom saw the world.  "To worry does nothing but steals from the loving and robs from the pleasure that's there."

And so he didn't worry his career along.  He let it unfold.  A staple of the Chicago music scene since the 1960s, his four decades performing built sustainable loyalty in his audiences.  A private party gig in Montana grew into a nine-year annual event.

A house concert in Wilmette became an annual festival.  A single word placed carefully about the quality of a young singer sparked a band and a CD.  A troupe of Chicagoans followed him at every local gig.  The songs bore repetition well and his intelligence and curiosity fed his patter between songs.  His songs spoke of friendship and he lived it.

A lifelong friend of Earl Pionke, "The Earl of Old Town," Dundee was part of the core of singer songwriters who created the Old Town scene in Chicago in the 1970s:  Steve Goodman, John Prine, Fred Holstein, Michael Smith.  The famous clubs of the time Holstein's, Wise Fools and Somebody's Else's Troubles formed the backdrop for the music and humor and the life of the Chicago music community.

Tom Dundee knew how to connect the dots.  Someone here, someone there, a dash of Dundee and things began to happen.  His caring for his audiences enfolded them early in the evening and then, carried by his guitar, songs, stories and humor, the audience would leave wanting more.

His gossamer songwriting touch and master musicianship built him a career touring nationally, and in Europe.  He lived and worked variously in New Mexico, California, Nevada, Washington State.  His twang and country music lilt developed while he was in Nashville where he eventually recorded his self-named CD and Lyfe Tyme Arhyme both produced by Mark Elliott for Flyte Records.

But he was Chicago born and bred, returning here after every loop of adventure and performances.  In recent years Tom was a touring member of the Weavers tribute group "Weavermania." Where he worked with Michael Smith, Barbara Barrow, Mark Dvorak, Chris Walz and others.

When he was off stage, Dundee's quiet attention to detail often placed him in the seat behind the sound board helping friends sound better or sometimes he would use his carpentering skills to build a speaker rack in a venue or a client's deck.  He'd turn up unexpectedly to ask a question and stay to solve a problem that interested him.  All the while his records quietly sold, his songs inspired public sculpture, his tunes played on elevators across the world.

Dundee's most recent project was the show called "Somebody Else's Troubles," a showcase of the established musicians from Jim Craig, Kat Eggleston, Corky Seigel and James Lee Stanley blended with newer talent that he thought deserved attention like Donna Adler and Gabrielle Schafer.  This show was presented in various venues like the Folk Series at Bill's Blues in Evanston and Lilly's on Lincoln over the past three years.

But it all stopped last weekend after a motorcycle accident early Saturday morning and Dundee's death April 18 from resulting complications.   A musical memorial tribute evening is planned on a date to be announced. He is survived by his partner Rhonda Perkins and several cousins.

Copyright Chicago Tribune

photo by friend Tony Beazley

References

External links
 Chicago Tribune web tribute to Dundee posted after his death

American country singer-songwriters
American male singer-songwriters
American folk singers
2006 deaths
1946 births
20th-century American singers
People from Corrales, New Mexico
20th-century American male singers
Folk musicians from New Mexico
Folk musicians from Chicago
21st-century American singers
21st-century American male singers
Singers from Chicago
Singers from New Mexico
Songwriters from New Mexico
Singer-songwriters from Illinois